9/3 may refer to:
September 3 (month-day date notation)
March 9 (day-month date notation)